Somethin' 4 the Riderz is the eight album by rapper, Frost. The album was released in 2003 for 40 Ounce Records. It contained Frost's unreleased and hard to find songs.  The album featured many guests including Ice-T, Above the Law, King Tee and DJ Quik.

Track listing
"Cali Tex Connection" feat. SPM
"How We Ride" feat. Mr. Gee & K-Borne
"Connection" feat. Mr. Coop
"Chicano Gambinos" feat. Mr. Gee & G' Fellas
"Maria" feat. Jay Tee & Baby Beesh
"Same Shit" feat. Jay Tee & Baby Beesh
"Presidential" feat. LSOB & Jay Tee
"City Of Angels" feat. Above the Law
"What's Goin' On?" feat. Jay Tee & Baby Beesh
"It Ain't Easy" feat. Gambino All Stars
"We Ride Hot" feat. Jay Tee & Messy Marv
"Got Bud" feat. Nino B & Don Cisco
"Mamacita" feat Don Cisco, Kurupt & Soopafly
"Last Nite" feat. Jay Tee
"West Coast, Gulf Coast, East Coast" feat. SPM & Baby Beesh
"Get High With Me" feat. Rappin' 4-Tay & Shorty B
"Let's Make A V" feat. King Tee, DJ Quik & James DeBarge
"What You Wanna Do" feat. Merciless & Javi Picasso
"Party Goin' Down Tonight" feat. Jay Tee
"Tears Of A Mother" feat. Ice-T

Frost (rapper) albums
2003 albums